Geastrum velutinum is a species of fungus in the family Geastraceae. Found in North America, it was first described scientifically by Andrew Price Morgan  in 1895.

References

External links

velutinum
Inedible fungi
Fungi described in 1895
Fungi of North America